Misthound Cirque is a cirque forming a large embayment in the east side of Haskell Ridge in the Darwin Mountains of Antarctica. It is the type locality for the Misthound Coal measures, a formation of the Beacon Sequence of the Darwin Mountains. The cirque was so named by the Victoria University of Wellington Antarctic Expedition of 1962–63, because of the eerie bleakness and often mist-filled floor of the cirque, which contains many peculiarly shaped boulders resembling large hounds.

References

Cirques of Antarctica
Landforms of Oates Land